Vivasayi is a 1967 Indian Tamil-language film, directed by M. A. Thirumugam and produced by Sandow M. M. A. Chinnappa Thevar. The film stars M. G. Ramachandran and K. R. Vijaya, with M. N. Nambiar, S. A. Ashokan, Nagesh and Manorama in supporting roles. It was released on 1 November 1967 during Diwali day.

Plot 

Muthaiya, a young agronomist and a farmer, full of ingenuity, a high integrity, a worker and a pride of his parents, the rich big landowner, Pannaiyar Duraiswamy and of his wife, the devoted Sivagami, revolutionise the exploitation of his father, by applying new methods of sowing. He so hopes to multiply tenfold the yield for humanitarian purposes and not necessarily for profit. Because one day, he takes the defence of unfortunate farmers despoiled of their ground, by his neighbour, another big farmer, Pannaiyar Velupandhiyan, an unscrupulous man, Muthaiya incurs the wrath of this very vindictive character. The situation complicates when the attractive Vijaya falls in love with the beautiful Muthaiya. Indeed, she is to be the sister-in-law of Velupandhiyan. And that the latter desired her ardently under the nose of his wife, the devoted believer Kaveri. To see her taking off from between his fingers, makes him particularly dangerous and obnoxious with his wife, Kaveri. Now, Muthaiya is even more in danger, Velupandhiyan wants to kill him.

Cast 

 M. G. Ramachandran as Muthaiya
 M. N. Nambiar as Pannaiyar Velupandiyan
 S. A. Ashokan as Gurusamy
 V. K. Ramasamy as Chokki's father, a pawnbroker
 Major Sundarrajan as Pannaiyar Duraisamy
 Sandow M. M. A. Chinnappa Thevar as Madasamy
 Nagesh as Chokkan
 K. R. Vijaya as Vijaya
 C. R. Vijayakumari as Kaveri
 Manorama as Chokki
 S. N. Lakshmi as Sivagami

Production 
After M. G. Ramachandran was shot in the throat by M. R. Radha on 12 January 1967, and was recovering in the hospital, Sandow M. M. A. Chinnappa Thevar visited him there and paid the advance for Vivasayi.

Soundtrack 
The music was composed by K. V. Mahadevan. The song "Ippadithaan Irukka Venum" stipulates how women should behave through its lyrics like "uduppugalai iduppu theriya maatakoodadhu" and "udhattu melay sivapu saayam poosa koodadhu".

Release and reception 
Vivasayi was released on 1 November 1967, Diwali day, and distributed by Senthil Movies. The Indian Express wrote, "The film is conspicuous for its lack of living with reality—though pretending to be one." Kalki said there was nothing to say about the film's story or cast performances.

References

External links 
 

1960s Tamil-language films
1967 films
Films directed by M. A. Thirumugam
Films scored by K. V. Mahadevan